The Purple Man (Zebediah Killgrave)  is a supervillain appearing in American comic books published by Marvel Comics. Created by writer Stan Lee and artist Joe Orlando, he first appeared in Daredevil #4 (October 1964). His body produces pheromones which allow him to verbally control the actions of others, and occasionally break the fourth wall for sinister effect. His stories typically involve him brainwashing other characters. Initially a recurring enemy of  Daredevil, he later became the archenemy of Jessica Jones.

A modified version of the character named Kevin Thompson/Kilgrave was portrayed by David Tennant in the Netflix television series Jessica Jones set in the Marvel Cinematic Universe (MCU), for which Tennant received critical praise, and for which the character was included in Rolling Stones list of the "40 Greatest TV Villains of All Time" while IGN ranked him #79 of the "Top 100 Villains".

Publication history
Purple Man first appeared in Daredevil #4 (November 1964) and was created by writer Stan Lee and artist Joe Orlando.

Fictional character biography
Zebediah Killgrave was born in Rijeka, Croatia. A physician turned international spy, he was sent to infiltrate a chemical refinery and was accidentally doused with a chemical that turned his hair and skin purple. Though he was caught and questioned, offering a weak alibi, he was released. Several more incidents like this demonstrated that the nerve gas had given Killgrave the ability to command the wills of other people. Calling himself the Purple Man, Killgrave embarked on a criminal career, where he was largely a Daredevil villain, fighting the Man Without Fear early in his career and being imprisoned in a special cell designed to dampen his powers, until he escaped and moved to San Francisco, building a small criminal enterprise over two years, only for Daredevil to topple it when he and Black Widow moved to the city.

Early in his criminal career, he used his mind-control powers to force a woman to become his wife. Before she recovered and left him, she became pregnant with his daughter, Kara Killgrave. Kara inherited his discoloration and powers and became the Alpha Flight-affiliated superhero called the Purple Girl, and later Persuasion in Alpha Flight issue #41.

The character largely disappeared from comic books during the 1980s although he did face Spider-Man, Moon Knight, Daredevil, Power Man, and Iron Fist in Marvel Team-Up Annual #4. He also appeared in the graphic novel Emperor Doom in which Doctor Doom uses Killgrave to power a machine called the "psycho-prism" that allowed Doom to control the minds of everyone on Earth. During the process, Purple Man finds out that he cannot control Doctor Doom's mind even at close range, as Doom's mental fortitude is too great.

He later reappeared in the pages of X-Men, as the mastermind behind Nate Grey's rise to super-celebrity status as a miracle worker in New York City. He had been subtly manipulating both the population of Manhattan and Nate himself into accepting and embracing the young exile from the "Age of Apocalypse" storyline as a modern messianic figure, who would then become so psychologically empowered by hero worship that he could and would literally change the reality of the world, using the full potential of his mutant power. The plan ultimately failed when Nate learns the truth and loses his confidence, thus reducing his power. Killgrave goes once more into hiding.

As detailed in the series Alias, the Purple Man has since been revealed to be linked to the history of Jessica Jones. When she was the superhero Jewel, he used his mind-control powers to subdue her, forcing her to live with him while psychologically torturing her for several months. He ultimately sends her off to kill Daredevil. The incident with Purple Man leaves her so traumatized that she leaves her life as a superhero behind and becomes a private investigator. Later, the Purple Man escapes again and tries controlling Jessica to kill the Avengers, but she is able to resist and knocks him out. Daredevil later has the Purple Man imprisoned in the Raft, a jail designed for super-powered criminals.

He escapes briefly when Electro creates a riot at the Raft. Purple Man then attempts to use the opportunity to mind control Luke Cage into killing the then soon-to-be-Avengers and threatens Jones, who is pregnant with Cage's child. Unknown to the Purple Man, drugs had been put into his food to negate his powers during his imprisonment, so he is unable to control Cage, who subsequently beats him to a pulp in response to his demands.

Later, the Purple Man returned shortly before (and during) the "House of M" storyline and manipulated the Thunderbolts, while being manipulated himself by Baron Zemo, who used the moonstones he had recently acquired to free Killgrave from prison, leaving an illusion in his place so that the authorities would not be aware of his escape. With his pheromones distributed through the New York City water system and Zemo's moonstones used to project his voice wherever necessary, the Purple Man enslaved the entire city. Under Zemo's direction, he used the city's superhumans as his personal army to attack the Thunderbolts, whom he had worked to turn against each other. Eventually, he was defeated by the Thunderbolts member Genis-Vell, after which Zemo teleported the Purple Man back and tortured him for his failure before sending him back to prison once more.

During the Scared Straight crossover between Thunderbolts and Avengers Academy, the Purple Man is revealed to be incarcerated in the Raft Maximum Security Penitentiary, as Tigra warns her Academy students not to look at his face or read his lips. During a subsequent power outage caused by Academy member Hazmat, the Purple Man, at the head of a small gang of mind-controlled inmates, again crosses paths with a lone Luke Cage, now supervisor of a Thunderbolts team composed of Raft prisoners. Cage makes short work of the Purple Man and his "recruits", revealing that the nanites that maintain control over his Thunderbolts also shield him from Killgrave's influence.

During the Fear Itself storyline, Purple Man and a majority of inmates are freed after the Raft is severely damaged by the transformation of the Juggernaut into Kuurth: Breaker of Stone and the subsequent damage caused by Kuurth's escape. Before escaping the Raft, the Purple Man attempts to kill a comatose Puppet Master in the prison infirmary, and makes statements indicating that he was behind the Puppet Master's manipulation of Misty Knight's Heroes for Hire organization, using them to establish a criminal organization by proxy while incarcerated. He is prevented from killing the Puppet Master by Heroes for Hire operatives Elektra and the Shroud, but Killgrave attacks the pair with a mob of mind-controlled inmates driven into a frenzy. When the heroes hold their own against the assault, the Purple Man changes tactics and turns them against each other. He subsequently escapes the Raft via the Hudson River.

Purple Man later began to form a new criminal empire with the help of Avalanche, Headhunter, Shocker, a new Death-Stalker, and a new Scourge.

During Daredevil's time in San Francisco after the exposure of his secret identity, he encountered the Purple Man's children, who had inherited their father's powers. After Matt saved the children from a mob and their father, they use a machine their father had created to enhance his powers to boost their own and erase the world's knowledge of Matt's identity as Daredevil.

Eventually, after tracking down Jessica Jones and taking control of Carol Danvers, Purple Man kills himself by force of will and Captain Marvel throws his body into the sun. They later discover that Danvers was being mind controlled and threw no one into the sun; his son Benjamin, who has similar powers, rescued and revived his body. 

While Killgrave is killed by Fisk in his crusades on banning superheroes in attempt to expand his criminal empires during Devil's Reign, the Purple Children are on the run from Fisk to ensure he never forcefully use their mind powers, and eventually being saved by a passing by May Parker.

Powers and abilities
The Purple Man's body produces chemical pheromones which, when inhaled or absorbed through the skin, allow Killgrave to control others' actions as long as he is physically present. These abilities can overwhelm most, but sufficiently strong-willed people, such as Doctor Doom and Kingpin, have been able to resist its influence, and Daredevil has been able to resist Killgrave as the powers rely on full sensory manipulation, Daredevil's blindness hindering the amount of input he receives and making it easier for him to resist what he picks up. Moon Knight defeated the Purple Man by wearing earplugs that prevented him from hearing the villain's commands; he, Daredevil, and other heroes gagged the Purple Man before giving him to the police to prevent him from commanding others.

Other versions
 In the alternate future of the 2003 series Marvel 1602, Killgrave becomes president for Life of the United States. The story is touched off by him accidentally sending Captain America into the past when he intended for the hero to be killed, so that no one would be inspired to overthrow him. 
 In the 2005 "House of M" storyline, Zebediah Killgrave (nicknamed "Zeb") is a powerless human who works as a lobbyist for the mutant-controlled government, but is secretly an agent of the human resistance.

In other media

Television

 Zebediah Killgrave appears in the X-Men: The Animated Series episode "No Mutant Is an Island", voiced by Cedric Smith.
 Purple Man appears in The Avengers: Earth's Mightiest Heroes, voiced by Brent Spiner. In the episode "Breakout, Part 1", Purple Man was an inmate of the Raft before he escapes alongside the other inmates. In the episode "Emperor Stark", Purple Man controls most of the Avengers in an attempt to take over the world until the Vision frees them.
 Kilgrave, a character based on Purple Man, appears in Jessica Jones, portrayed by David Tennant as an adult and James Freedson-Jackson as a child. This version, also known as Kevin Thompson, gained his mind control powers from experimentation by his scientist parents, Louise and Albert Thompson. Prior to and during the first season, Kilgrave manipulated Jessica Jones into killing Reva Connors and became obsessed with the former. To this end, he tries to prove his love to her by creating chaos for her to solve. Jones eventually kills Kilgrave before Jeri Hogarth later has her exonerated for the murder by convincing the jury a guilt-ridden Kilgrave had controlled her into doing it. In the second season, Kilgrave reappears as a hallucination after Jones accidentally kills Dale Holiday, a sadistic prison guard and serial killer who had been torturing her mother in prison. Manifesting Jessica's guilt, Kilgrave repeatedly taunts her over the act until she spares Dr. Karl Malus, causing the Kilgrave hallucination to disappear. In the third season, Jones hears Kilgrave's voice reaffirm her decision to leave New York in her head, but she decides not to.

Video games
 Purple Man appeared in Marvel Avengers Alliance.
 Killgrave appeared in Marvel Avengers Academy.

References

External links
 "Purple Man". Marvel.com
 Purple Man at Marvel Wiki
 
 
 Purple Man's entry at MarvelDirectory.com

Characters created by Stan Lee
Characters created by Joe Orlando
Comics characters introduced in 1964
Fictional characters who break the fourth wall
Fictional Croatian people
Fictional hypnotists and indoctrinators
Fictional physicians
Fictional rapists
Fictional torturers
Fictional matricides
Fictional secret agents and spies
Marvel Comics mutates
Marvel Comics supervillains
Marvel Comics male supervillains
Marvel Comics telepaths
Marvel Comics television characters
American male characters in television
Villains in animated television series